Roland Gergye (born 24 February 1993) is a Hungarian professional volleyball player. He is a member of the Hungary national team.

Honours
 CEV Cup
  2018/2019 – with Galatasaray İstanbul

 National championships
 2010/2011  Hungarian Cup, with Volleyball Kaposvár
 2010/2011  Hungarian Championship, with Volleyball Kaposvár
 2011/2012  Hungarian Cup, with Volleyball Kaposvár
 2011/2012  Hungarian Championship, with Volleyball Kaposvár
 2012/2013  Hungarian Cup, with Volleyball Kaposvár
 2012/2013  Hungarian Championship, with Volleyball Kaposvár
 2013/2014  German Cup, with VfB Friedrichshafen
 2014/2015  German Cup, with VfB Friedrichshafen
 2014/2015  German Championship, with VfB Friedrichshafen
 2019/2020  Greek Championship, with Olympiacos Piraeus

References

External links

 
 Player profile at PlusLiga.pl  
 Player profile at Volleybox.net

1993 births
Living people
People from Kaposvár
Sportspeople from Somogy County
Hungarian men's volleyball players
Hungarian expatriate sportspeople in Germany
Expatriate volleyball players in Germany
Hungarian expatriate sportspeople in France
Expatriate volleyball players in France
Hungarian expatriate sportspeople in Turkey
Expatriate volleyball players in Turkey
Hungarian expatriate sportspeople in Greece
Expatriate volleyball players in Greece
Hungarian expatriate sportspeople in Slovenia
Expatriate volleyball players in Slovenia
Hungarian expatriate sportspeople in Poland
Expatriate volleyball players in Poland
Paris Volley players
Galatasaray S.K. (men's volleyball) players
Olympiacos S.C. players
BBTS Bielsko-Biała players
Outside hitters